Mona McSharry (born 21 August 2000) is an Irish swimmer. She competed at the 2020 Summer Olympics in Tokyo in 2021

She is the holder of multiple national senior records  (50 m, 100 m and 200 m breaststroke and 50 m butterfly in long course, 50 m and 100 m breaststroke and 100 m individual medley in short course as well as mixed relay records in 4x50m FTR National Team and 4x50m MTR National Team both over short course). In August 2017, she earned the women's swimming title of 100 m breaststroke junior world champion during the World Junior Championships, in Indianapolis. She has also competed in senior competitions, including the 2017 World Aquatics Championships,

Media career
In 2019, McSharry and her family competed in the seventh series of the popular RTÉ reality competition, Ireland's Fittest Family. They won the competition under the guidance of mentor, former rugby player, Donncha O'Callaghan.

References

External links
 

2000 births
Living people
Irish female swimmers
European Games competitors for Ireland
Female breaststroke swimmers
Place of birth missing (living people)
Swimmers at the 2015 European Games
Swimmers at the 2018 Summer Youth Olympics
Swimmers at the 2020 Summer Olympics
Olympic swimmers of Ireland
Medalists at the FINA World Swimming Championships (25 m)
21st-century Irish women